Greater Louisville Inc. (GLI) is an organization that promotes the growth of businesses in Louisville, Kentucky, USA, and the surrounding counties.

History
In 1862, 220 firms paid $1 each to join the Louisville Board of Trade. Prior to that, there was a Merchants Exchange that met monthly during the 1850s on the southeast corner of Second and Main. In 1913, a Convention Bureau was formed. And, in 1943, a convention Bureau was formed. By 1950, these groups plus the Retail Merchants Association, incorporated into the Louisville Chamber of Commerce. It was renamed Louisville Area Chamber of Commerce, and was one of the first such groups accredited by the United States Chamber of Commerce.

Dr. Kenneth Vinsel was named the first Chief Executive Officer of The Chamber. The first issue of Louisville Magazine was unveiled on March 1, 1950. The offices were located on Fifth Street, between Jefferson and Liberty. In 1951, The Chamber moved to the Courier-Journal and Louisville Times Building at 300 West Liberty. The Chamber also played a key role in attracting General Electric to Louisville.

The Louisville Development Committee was launched in 1971 to promote Louisville nationally, using direct mailings of Louisville magazine, published by the Chamber. The chamber also revitalized the Kentucky Derby Festival in the 1970s by providing car pooling and business support services.

In the 1990s, the chamber moved to the Commerce Center at 600 W. Main and sold Louisville magazine. In 1997 the Louisville Area Chamber of Commerce merged with the Greater Louisville Economic Development Partnership, which had been founded in 1987, and in January 1998 the board voted to rename the chamber as Greater Louisville Inc. In 1978, Leadership Louisville was launched at The Chamber.  This program, designed to broaden the horizons of local leaders, continues to grow and now operates out of separate offices.

In early 1998, GLI became a strategic economic development partner with Metro Louisville Government, leading business attraction and expansion responsibilities for the Louisville area. Also in 1998, GLI launched EnterpriseCorp to assist fast-growth, entrepreneurial companies, and launched a new Workforce initiative to retain and recruit qualified workers for the region.

GLI moved into its new (and current) headquarters building at 614 W Main in downtown Louisville in 2002. In 2009, GLI launched the Greater Louisville Internationals Professionals (G.L.I.P.) program to attract and retain international talent in our community. The first of its kind in the nation, the program creates networking, professional development, mentoring, and attraction opportunities for international professionals across the region.

In early 2015, Greater Louisville Inc. partnered with surrounding economic development organizations in Kentucky and Southern Indiana to form Advance Greater Louisville, the Regional Economic Development Partnership, which accelerates regional economic growth and raises awareness of the community both nationally and internationally. The Advance Greater Louisville partnership represents all counties in the Louisville metropolitan area.

President/CEO
K. P. Vinsel (1950–1966). Former University of Louisville professor
Charles F. Herd (1966–1983). Previously headed Knoxville's Chamber of Commerce
James O. Robertson (1983–1991). Economic development expert
Robert H. Gayle (1991–1996)
Douglass Cobb (1996–1997)
Steven Higdon (2000–2005)
Joe Reagan (2005–2011)
Craig Richard (2012–2014)
Kent Oyler (2014–present)

See also

 Economy of Louisville, Kentucky

References

External links
 

Economy of Louisville, Kentucky
Louisville, Kentucky
Organizations established in 1943
1943 establishments in Kentucky